The Bread of Life Church is an independent Chinese church that was founded in Shanghai, Republic of China in 1942, which has churches in Asia, Australia, and North America.

History 
During the Second Sino-Japanese War, the International Settlement in Shanghai was seized by Japanese troops in December 1941, putting a stop to Western missions in the region. The next year, in June 1942, the Christian and Missionary Alliance pastor Timothy Dzao (1908-1973) established the Bread of Life Church in Shanghai. It aspired to be an indigenous church which followed the three-self principle.

By the time of the communist victory in mainland China, Dzao moved his headquarters first to Hong Kong in 1949, before moving it to Taipei, Taiwan in 1954. When  (born 1941) became the senior pastor of the Bread of Life Church in Taipei (1977-2011), the church began have a stronger emphasis on a charismatic infilling of the Holy Spirit. 

The church eventually started a seminary in 1990 and, in 2005, the church was reported to have 33,132 members in Taiwan and 134 churches have been planted all around the world.

Today there are currently 306 churches all over the world.

References

External links
Bread of Life Church, Taipei
Bread of Life Church, Hong Kong
Bread of Life Church, Guatemala City
Bread of Life Church, California
Bread of Life Christian Church in San Diego, California (聖地牙哥靈糧堂)
Bread of Life Church, Toronto
Perth Bread of Life Christian Church, Australia

Chinese Independent Churches
Christian organizations established in 1943
1943 establishments in China